Valdosaurus ("Weald Lizard") is a genus of bipedal herbivorous iguanodont ornithopod dinosaur found on the Isle of Wight and elsewhere in England, Spain and possibly also Romania. It lived during the Early Cretaceous.

Discovery and naming

In the nineteenth century Reverend William Darwin Fox collected two small thighbones near Cowleaze Chine on the southwest coast of the Isle of Wight. In 1868 he incorrectly suggested these may have come from the same individual that had in 1848 been uncovered for Gideon Mantell as a fossil of Iguanodon, and which in 1869 would be named as the new genus Hypsilophodon. Regardless, both femora, made part of the collection of the British Museum of Natural History as specimens BMNH R184 and BMNH R185, would be commonly referred to the latter genus.

However, in 1975 Peter Galton named them as a new species of Dryosaurus: Dryosaurus canaliculatus. The specific name means "with a small channel" in Latin, referring to a distinct groove between the condyles of the lower thighbone. In 1977 Galton named a new genus for them: Valdosaurus, the name being derived from Latin Valdus, "Wealden", a reference to the Wealden Group. Its type species, D. canaliculatus, was thus renamed V. canaliculatus. A second species, V. nigeriensis, was described  by Galton and Philippe Taquet from younger rocks from Niger in 1982; this has since been transferred to its own genus, Elrhazosaurus.

In 1998 William Blows inadvertently named another species, Valdosaurus dextrapoda, by including this name in a fauna list, but this was an error, and the species has never been supported. Lacking description, it is a nomen nudum.

Distribution and material
Having a close European relative of the American form Dryosaurus named led to most of the dryosaurid fossil material of Europe being referred to Valdosaurus. Valdosaurus was seen as not only present in England (the Wessex Formation of the Isle of Wight and the Hastings Beds of West Sussex) but probably also in Spain. These rock units were deposited between the Berriasian and Barremian stages, between approximately 145 and 125 million years ago. V. canaliculatus would then be known from thigh bones, extensive additional postcranial elements, partial lower jaws, and teeth.

In 2009 however, Galton critically reviewed the Valdosaurus material. He concluded that no fossils from outside England could be reliably referred to the genus. He thus gave V. nigeriensis its own genus: Elrhazosaurus. Even of many of the English specimens it was uncertain whether they belonged to Valdosaurus, including all cranial elements and teeth. Some hindlimb and pelvis bones from the Upper Weald Clay Formation (late Barremian) were referable to V. canaliculatus. Some material from the earlier Hastings Beds (Valanginian) were referred to a Valdosaurus sp. Galton established that Richard Owen had in 1842 been the first to describe Valdosaurus thighbones, specimens BMB 004297-004300, assigning them to Iguanodon. Galton emphasized that though the type femora were very small, fourteen centimetres long (which has led to estimates of a length of 1.2 metres and a weight of ten kilograms), these were from a juvenile individual and that an adult would have been a "medium-sized euornithopod", with some thighbones reaching a length of half a metre.

In 2016, a new specimen of Valdosaurus was described. The specimen is the most complete yet found, which was found in articulation and includes a partial dorsal series, an almost complete tail, pelvic material, and both hind limbs.

Phylogeny
Galton assigned Valdosaurus to the Hypsilophodontidae, but this paraphyletic unnatural group has largely been abandoned. Today Valdosaurus is generally considered a member of the Dryosauridae.

See also 
 Dinosaurs of the Isle of Wight

References

External links 

 Valdosaurus at Dinosaur Isle
 Valdosaurus at National History Museum
 Valdosaurus at Dino Data

Iguanodonts
Barremian life
Hauterivian life
Valanginian life
Early Cretaceous dinosaurs of Europe
Cretaceous England
Cretaceous Romania
Cretaceous Spain
Fossils of England
Fossils of Romania
Fossils of Spain
Fossil taxa described in 1977
Taxa named by Peter Galton
Ornithischian genera